The  Asian Men's Volleyball Championship was the sixth staging of the Asian Men's Volleyball Championship, a biennial international volleyball tournament organised by the Asian Volleyball Confederation (AVC) with Australia Volleyball Federation (AVF). The tournament was held in Perth, Western Australia from 11 to 16 August 1991.

Preliminary round

Pool A

|}

|-

|}

Pool B

|}

|}

Pool C

|}

|}

Pool D

|}

|}

Classification round

Pool E

|}

|}

Pool F

|}

|}

Final round

Classification 13th–15th

13th–15th semifinals
|}

13th place match
|}

Classification 9th–12th

9th–12th semifinals
|}

11th place match
|}

9th place match
|}

Classification 5th–8th

9th–12th semifinals
|}

7th place match
|}

5th place match
|}

Championship

Semifinals

|}

3rd place match

|}

Final

|}

Final standing

References
Results

A
V
Asian men's volleyball championships
Sports competitions in Perth, Western Australia
International volleyball competitions hosted by Australia
1990s in Perth, Western Australia